Mount Job is one of six named volcanic peaks of the Mount Meager massif in British Columbia, Canada. It is a pile of rubble held together by volcanic ash and sand. The main summit of Mount Job is hard to climb because of difficult access and its horribly loose rock.

See also
 List of volcanoes in Canada
 Volcanism of Canada
 Volcanism of Western Canada
 Cascade Volcanoes
 Garibaldi Volcanic Belt

References
 

Volcanoes of British Columbia
Two-thousanders of British Columbia
Mount Meager massif
Subduction volcanoes
Stratovolcanoes of Canada
Pliocene volcanoes
Pleistocene stratovolcanoes
Lillooet Land District